Robert Elliott Freer (January 30, 1896 – January 6, 1963) was an Ohio attorney who served as chair of the Federal Trade Commission from January 1, 1939, to December 31, 1939, again from January 1, 1944, to December 31, 1944, and a third time from January 1, 1948, to December 31, 1948.

Education, military service, and career
Born in Madisonville, Cincinnati, Ohio, Freer received an LL.B. from the University of Cincinnati College of Law in 1917, and entered the practice of law in Cincinnati that same year. He served in the United States Army during World War II in the 324th Infantry Regiment, and was deployed to France.

In 1925, he became an attorney with the Bureau of Valuation within the Interstate Commerce Commission. He received an LL.M. from the Washington College of Law in 1929. In 1935, President Franklin D. Roosevelt appointed Freer as a Republican member of the FTC. Freer was reappointed to the FTC by President Harry S. Truman in 1948, but resigned later that year to return to the practice of law.

In 1960, Freer returned to government service as a hearing examiner for the Federal Power Commission

Professional affiliations 
 1928: Elected membership by his alma mater, University of Cincinnati College of Law, to the Order of the Coif

Personal life and death
Freer married three times, first – on October 28, 1919, in Newport, Kentucky – to Hazel Louise Davis (maiden; 1898–1975). He then married – on 11 Apr 1925, in Marion County, Ohio – Olive Roberts (maiden; 1898–1973). Freer then married – on September 7, 1939, in McConnellsburg, Pennsylvania – Alice Elizabeth Barry (maiden; 1905–1979), and adopted her two daughters and one son from her prior marriage to Harold Wadsworth Sullivan (1896–1969), former Assistant Attorney General for Massachusetts.  Together, he and Alice had a son. Alice's father, Edward P. Barry, had been Lieutenant Governor of Massachusetts. with whom he had two sons and two daughters. Alice, in 1933, earned a law degree from the Portia Law School in Boston.

Freer died of multiple myeloma at the age of 66, and was interred at Arlington National Cemetery.

Bibliography

Notes

References

  ; .

 

 
 

 .

  ; ; .

  ; .

 

1896 births
1963 deaths
People from Cincinnati
University of Cincinnati College of Law alumni
Washington College of Law alumni
Federal Trade Commission personnel
Deaths from multiple myeloma